San Isidro is a district of the San Isidro canton, in the Heredia province of Costa Rica.

Geography 
San Isidro has an area of  km² and an elevation of  metres.

Demographics 

For the 2011 census, San Isidro had a population of  inhabitants.

Transportation

Road transportation 
The district is covered by the following road routes:
 National Route 112
 National Route 116

References 

Districts of Heredia Province
Populated places in Heredia Province